Zori Hayki Balayan (born February 10, 1935) is an Armenian novelist, journalist, sports doctor, traveler and sports expert. He was awarded the "Renowned master of the Arts" an Armenian official title.

Biography
Balayan was born in Stepanakert, Nagorno-Karabakh Autonomous Oblast (Azerbaijan SSR). He graduated from the Ryazan State Medical University in 1963. From 1971 to 1973 he traversed the Kamchatka and Chokotskaya tundras on dog-sleds, traveling as far as the North Sea. In his essay "Hearth," published during the pre-perestroika era, he tried to demonstrate the Armenian identity of Nagorno-Karabakh and identified Nakhichevan as historically belonging to Armenia. He further regarded Turks (including Azerbaijan) as an enemy of both Russia and Armenia. Azerbaijani historian Isa Gambar criticized Balayan's book in an article entitled Old Songs and New Legends.

In 1988 he and Armenian poet Silva Kaputikyan were received by Mikhail Gorbachev and discussed the absence of Armenian-language television programs and textbooks in Nagorno-Karabakh schools as well as other concerns of Karabakh's majority-Armenian population.

In October 1993, he signed the Letter of Forty-Two.

Balayan is a journalist for the weekly Russian-language publication Literaturnaya Gazeta.

Controversy
There exists an allegation, mainly propagated by mainstream Azerbaijani and Turkish sources, that Zori Balayan confessed to the killing of an Azerbaijani child. The allegations are purported to be from a paragraph in a book entitled Revival of Our Souls or Revival of Our Spirits, supposedly written by Zori Balayan. Balayan, as well as the Ministry of Foreign Affairs of Armenia, have come out denying him having ever written such a book. Ayse Gunaysu, member of the Committee Against Racism and Discrimination of the Human Rights Association of Turkey (Istanbul branch) has said "it should be quite obvious, from the language used in depicting the torture, that the quotation was wholly made up." Onur Caymaz, a Turkish writer, who originally backed the allegation, stated that he was wrong and that Balayan hadn't written such a book.

Interpol
The authorities in Azerbaijan allege that Balayan was involved in a terrorist bombing of the metro in Baku in 1994. In a letter to Balayan, the general secretary of Interpol, however, stated that the agency considered the complaint politically motivated and that it had removed Balayan from its wanted list as a result.

Critics in Armenia
Balayan's views on the annexation of Crimea by Russia and alleged lobbying activities were criticized by some Armenian politicians, including Igor Muradyan and Levon Ter-Petrosian. Balayan's letter to Vladimir Putin, in which he implies that both Armenia and Karabakh are Russian soil, met harsh criticism in Armenia in 2013.

Books
 My Cilicia, (Russian), Yerevan, 2004
 Zim Kilikia (Զիմ Կիլիկիա (Armenian)), Yerevan 2005
 Cilicia (Կիլիկիա (Armenian)), vols. 2 and 3, Yerevan 2006 - 2007
 Chasm, (Armenian and Russian), Yerevan, 2004
 Heaven and Hell (Armenian, Russian and English) Los Angeles, 1997, Yerevan, 1995
 Hearth, Moscow 1984, Yerevan 1981
 Between Two Fires, Yerevan 1979
 Blue roads, Yerevan 1975
 Required Man's opinion, (Russian) Yerevan 1974

References

External links
 Zori Balayan's biography

1935 births
Living people
People from Stepanakert
Armenian journalists
Armenian sports physicians
Armenian novelists
Armenian male novelists
Armenian people of the Nagorno-Karabakh War
21st-century Armenian male writers
20th-century Armenian novelists
21st-century Armenian novelists
20th-century male writers
21st-century male writers
Soviet sports physicians